Two-Fisted Law is a 1932 American pre-Code Western film directed by D. Ross Lederman for Columbia Pictures, starring Tim McCoy and featuring John Wayne playing a character named "Duke". The picture also features Alice Day, Wheeler Oakman, Tully Marshall, Wallace MacDonald, and Walter Brennan.

Plot

Cast
Tim McCoy as Tim Clark
Alice Day as Betty Owen 
Wheeler Oakman as Bob Russell 
Tully Marshall as Sheriff Malcolm 
Wallace MacDonald as Artie 
John Wayne as Duke 
Walter Brennan as Deputy Sheriff Bendix  
Richard Alexander as Zeke Yokum 
Merrill McCormick as Green, the Agent (uncredited) 
Bud Osborne as Henchman Jiggs Tyler (uncredited) 
Arthur Thalasso as Bartender Jake (uncredited)

See also
 John Wayne filmography

External links
 
 

1932 films
American black-and-white films
1930s English-language films
Columbia Pictures films
1932 Western (genre) films
American Western (genre) films
Films directed by D. Ross Lederman
1930s American films